Zgornja Nova Vas is a small village in the Pohorje Hills north of Slovenska Bistrica in northeastern Slovenia. The area is part of the traditional region of Styria. It is now included with the rest of the municipality in the Drava Statistical Region.

A small chapel in the centre of the settlement dates to the mid-19th century.

References

External links
Zgornja Nova Vas at Geopedia

Populated places in the Municipality of Slovenska Bistrica